Doreen Norton, OBE, FRCN (1 May 1922, in Dartford, Kent – 30 December 2007, in Worthing, West Sussex) was an English nurse, in the 1950s she used research to show that the best treatment and prevention of bedsores was removing the pressure by turning the patient.

She was made a Fellow of the Royal College of Nursing in 1976.

Norton was regarded as instrumental in changing nursing practices to effectively treat pressure ulcers, a major killer of hospital inpatients.

References

1922 births
2007 deaths
English nurses
Officers of the Order of the British Empire
People from Dartford
People from Worthing
Fellows of the Royal College of Nursing
People in public health

British nurses